Tan Sio Beng is an ex-Singapore international footballer who plays as a defender for NFL Division 2 side Admiralty FC.

Tan is known to be a tenacious player with a strong mentality to win.

Club career
Tan's dogged performances during training for Balestier Khalsa led to his debut in 1999 after he impressed Tigers coach PN Sivaji. 

Tan has turned out for S.League sides Balestier Khalsa, Sengkang Marine and Tanjong Pagar United  as well as two stints with Singapore Cricket Club in the NFL Division 1 before making the switch to Admiralty FC in 2012. He spent five seasons at Balestier Khalsa and four seasons at Sengkang Punggol. 

Tan had an on-pitch fight with Gusta Guzarishah during a match between Balestier Khalsa and Home United in 1999.

Tan was sent off while playing for Balestier Khalsa in 2005 for violent conduct  after Home United skipper Aide Iskandar's challenge on Balestier's keeper, Rizal Rahman, sparked a fight. Balestier subsequently lodged an appeal against the red card but the appeal was rejected. 

In 2007, Tan was punished by Sengkang Punggol after his side's 4-3 win over Phnom Penh Empire in a Singapore Cup first-round match for shouting obscenities at his coach, Jörg Steinebruner after he was reprimanded for his poor performance on the pitch that day.

International career

Tan was included in the 2002 Tiger Cup squad after his convincing displays in the S.League for Balestier Khalsa. 

He has played a total of 7 times for Singapore and scored 1 goal at international level.

Coaching career 
Following the departure of former player coach Mohd Noor Ali to Geylang United in June 2012, Tan was also appointed as the assistant coach of the Wolves.

Tan was also the coach for Nanyang Junior College's soccer team.

References

Singaporean footballers
Singapore Premier League players
Singapore international footballers
1976 births
Living people
Balestier Khalsa FC players
Hougang United FC players
Tanjong Pagar United FC players
Association football defenders
Singaporean sportspeople of Chinese descent